The Keneally ministry is the 92nd ministry of the Government of New South Wales, and was led by the 42nd Premier Kristina Keneally.

The ministry was formed following a caucus motion to elect a new Leader of the Australian Labor Party in New South Wales, where Keneally defeated her party colleague, the 41st Premier, Nathan Rees. Keneally led the first two-woman executive (Premier and Deputy Premier) in Australian history.

The ministry was sworn in on 8 December 2009 at Government House by the Governor of New South Wales Marie Bashir. A few days earlier, on 4 December 2009, Keneally and her Deputy, Carmel Tebbutt were sworn in by the Governor, as Premier and Deputy Premier respectively at a ceremony also held at Government House.

This ministry covers the  period from 4 December 2009 until 28 March 2011 when the 2011 state election was held, resulting in the loss of Labor to the Coalition; with the O'Farrell ministry gaining government.

Composition of ministry

The composition of the ministry was announced by Premier Keneally on 8 December 2009. The first reshuffle in May 2010 was triggered by the resignation of David Campbell. In June 2010 Graham West resigned citing family reasons and Ian Macdonald resigned after admitting to "errors" in his travel allowance. In September 2010 Paul McLeay resigned.

Ministry was dissolved on 28 March 2011, following its defeat at the 2011 state election.

 
Ministers are members of the Legislative Assembly unless otherwise noted.

See also

Members of the New South Wales Legislative Assembly, 2007-2011
Members of the New South Wales Legislative Council, 2007-2011

Notes

References

 

! colspan=3 style="border-top: 5px solid #cccccc" | New South Wales government ministries

New South Wales ministries
2009 establishments in Australia
2011 disestablishments in Australia
Australian Labor Party ministries in New South Wales